U.S. Route 160 (US-160) is a part of the U.S. Highway System that runs from US-89 near Tuba City, Arizona east to US-67 and Missouri Route 158 southwest of Poplar Bluff, Missouri. In the U.S. state of Kansas, US-160 is a main east–west highway that runs from the Colorado border east to the Missouri border.

Route description
US-160 enters Kansas just west of Saunders. It goes northeast to Johnson City, then turns east to go through Ulysses. Near Sublette, it intersects U.S. Route 83 and runs concurrently southward past its intersection with U.S. Route 56. It turns east and then runs concurrently with U.S. Route 54 between Plains and Meade. It continues east, and runs concurrently with U.S. Route 283 and U.S. Route 183. At Medicine Lodge, it intersects U.S. Route 281. It continues east and at Wellington, intersects U.S. Route 81 and then Interstate 35, on which the Kansas Turnpike is routed in the area.

East of Interstate 35, it intersects U.S. Route 77 in Winfield. It goes east from Winfield, then turns north to Burden, then goes east before going south to Elk City. It then turns east and goes through Independence after being concurrent with U.S. Route 75. It continues east, is briefly concurrent with U.S. Route 169 and then intersects U.S. Route 59 at Altamont. US-160 and US-59 then go into Oswego and separate. At Columbus, US-160 begins a concurrency with U.S. Route 69, which goes east to Crestline, then north to Frontenac, Kansas. Also at Crestline, it picks up a second concurrency with U.S. Route 400, which goes north and ends just south of Pittsburg, Kansas. After Frontenac, it turns east and enters Missouri.

The section of US-160 in Harper, from K-14 to slightly east of end of overlap with K-2 is maintained by the city. The entire  section within Wellington is maintained by the city.

History

The section of US-160 from the Colorado border to Santa Fe was established in 1927 as K-46. The section from K-22, now US-83, south of Sublette east to Pittsburg was established in 1927 as K-12. US-160 was extended into Kansas between 1930 and 1931, which resulted in K-46 being decommissioned and K-12 being truncated to US-54 north of Liberal. 

East of Coldwater, US-160 originally turned north to Wilmore then curved southwest and traveled through Sun City and Lake City to its current alignment west of Medicine Lodge. Then between 1941 and 1944, a new alignment was built to travel directly east–west from Coldwater to Medicine Lodge. East of Independence, US-160 originally followed US-169 north to K-37 then east to US-400, which it followed to its current alignment south of Pittsburg. Then in a December 9, 1998 resolution, US-160 was realigned over K-96 from US-169 east to US-69 Alternate then turned north toward Pittsburg.

Between 1951 and 1952, the alignment was shifted south between the Colorado border and Johnson.

Major intersections

References

External links

Kansas Department of Transportation State Map
KDOT: Historic State Maps

160
 Kansas
Transportation in Stanton County, Kansas
Transportation in Grant County, Kansas
Transportation in Haskell County, Kansas
Transportation in Seward County, Kansas
Transportation in Meade County, Kansas
Transportation in Clark County, Kansas
Transportation in Comanche County, Kansas
Transportation in Barber County, Kansas
Transportation in Harper County, Kansas
Transportation in Sumner County, Kansas
Transportation in Cowley County, Kansas
Transportation in Elk County, Kansas
Transportation in Montgomery County, Kansas
Transportation in Labette County, Kansas
Transportation in Cherokee County, Kansas
Transportation in Crawford County, Kansas